2009 Emmy Awards may refer to:

 61st Primetime Emmy Awards, the 2009 Emmy Awards ceremony that honored primetime programming during June 2008 – May 2009
 36th Daytime Emmy Awards, the 2009 Emmy Awards ceremony that honored daytime programming during 2008
 30th Sports Emmy Awards, the 2009 Emmy Awards ceremony that honored sports programming during 2008
 37th International Emmy Awards, honoring international programming

Emmy Award ceremonies by year